The Ethiopian banana frog (Afrixalus enseticola), also known as the Bonga banana frog, is a small species of frog that is endemic to Ethiopia. It is classified as "vulnerable" on the IUCN Red List (2004) due to decline of forested habitat in the highlands.

References

External links
 Global Amphibian Assessment Of Ethiopian Banana Frog

Hyperoliidae
Afrixalus
Amphibians of Ethiopia
Endemic fauna of Ethiopia
Amphibians described in 1974